The Women's 76 kg weightlifting competitions at the 2020 Summer Olympics in Tokyo took place on 1 August at the Tokyo International Forum.

Records

Results

References

Weightlifting at the 2020 Summer Olympics
Olymp
Women's events at the 2020 Summer Olympics